Shahidullah Khan is a Bangladesh Nationalist Party politician and the former Member of Parliament of Sirajganj-5.

Career
Khan was elected to parliament from Sirajganj-5 as a Bangladesh Nationalist Party candidate in 1991.

References

Bangladesh Nationalist Party politicians
Living people
5th Jatiya Sangsad members
Year of birth missing (living people)